The Roland W-30 is a sampling workstation keyboard, released in 1989. It features an on-board 12-bit sampler, sample-based synthesizer, 16-track sequencer and 61-note keyboard.

Overview 
The W-30's "Workstation" title stems from its incorporation of synthesis, sampling and MIDI sequencing capabilities. Although primitive by modern standards, the W-30's onboard sequencer was a practical way to arrange music as opposed to a DAW.

Unusually, while sounds are sampled with 12-bit resolution, they are played back through a 16-bit D-A converter which, in theory at least, improves the sound quality. Nonetheless, the slightly "gritty" nature of the samples could be considered one of the instrument's charms.

The W-30 is compatible with the sound library of the Roland S-50, S330 & S550 dedicated samplers, which are now in the public domain.

Expansion 
The workstation's back panel features a blanking-plate labelled SCSI. This allowed the very rare "KW30 SCSI kit" upgrade to be fitted.
The KW30 gave the W-30 the ability to behave as a SCSI Master device, and drive SCSI hard drives and CD-ROM players through a standard 25-pin SCSI cable.
Copying samples to a SCSI hard drive (maximum usable capacity: 80Mb) dramatically reduces load time compared to the built-in 3.5" floppy disk drive.

Notable users 

 Erick Sermon 
 Liam Howlett of The Prodigy used the W-30 as his main songwriting device until 1997's The Fat of the Land and on-stage as a master keyboard up until 2008  
Steve Hillier of Dubstar programmed the entirety of the band's first album Disgraceful on a W-30. It was retired for the band's first European tour in 1996 
 Andrés Bobe of La Ley programmed the keyboards and sequences from 1990-1994, mostly for the album Doble Opuesto  
 DJ Paul of Three 6 Mafia created the gritty, 90s proto-trap sound by re-sampling the groups' hooks to be used across many of their releases. DJ Paul still uses the W-30 to this day.
 Hiroyuki Iwatsuki used the W-30 to write the music for the SNES game Wild Guns.
 Luis Alberto Spinetta's 1991 album Pelusón of Milk was produced mostly on his W-30 at home, while "waiting for Vera", his daughter, to be born
 Project Pitchfork used on the albums Dhyani, Lam-'Bras, Entities, Io, Alpha Omega.

References

External links
W-30 / S-50 / S-550 Homepage - Samples, DIY's and Reference Materials - A Website Dedicated To The Original Roland Samplers - http://llamamusic.com/s50s550/s-50_s-550.html

W-30
Music workstations
Polyphonic synthesizers
Digital synthesizers
Samplers (musical instrument)